Live or Split Lip Rayfield Live is the first live album from the bluegrass/punk band Split Lip Rayfield.  It was recorded live on New Year's Eve of 2003 at The Bottleneck in Lawrence, Kansas.  It contains music from their first three albums and the music is significantly faster than the studio-recorded versions.

Track listing

Flat Black Rag (Eaton, Rundstrom) 2:00
Truckin' Song (Gottstine) 1:59
In the Ground (Mardis) 2:36
Record Shop (Rundstrom) 3:40
Cutie Pie (Eaton, Rundstrom) 2:41
P.B. (Rundstrom) 2:39
Used to Call Me Baby (Gottstine) 3:40
Trouble (Rundstrom) 3:20
Whiskey Is Gone (Rundstrom) 1:37
Old #6 (Gottstine) 2:53
Kiss of Death 	(Mardis) 4:18
Devil (Rundstrom) 2:43
Never Make It Home (Gottstine) 3:20
Coffee (Rundstrom) 1:59
3.2 Flu (Gottstine) 2:15
River (Gottstine) 4:01
Hounds (Mardis) 2:52
Movin' to Virginia (Gottstine) 2:49
San Antone (Rundstrom) 6:48

Personnel
Jeff Eaton –  Gas Tank Bass, Vocals
Wayne Gottstine    – Mandolin, Vocals
Kirk Rundstrom    –  Guitar, Vocals
Eric Mardis   –  Banjo, Vocals

Split Lip Rayfield albums
2004 live albums